The Ashley Formation is a geologic formation in South Carolina. It preserves fossils dating back to the Paleogene period.

Vertebrate fauna

Mammals

Reptiles

Fish

Cartilaginous fish

Bony fish

See also

 List of fossiliferous stratigraphic units in South Carolina
 Paleontology in South Carolina

References

 

Paleogene geology of South Carolina